రైతుకూలీ సంఘం (ఆంధ్రప్రదెౕశ్)/ Raitu Coolie Sangham (Andhra Pradesh) (Farmers Labourers League (Andhra Pradesh)) is a revolutionary peasants' movement in the Indian state of Andhra Pradesh, related to the Communist Party of India (Marxist-Leninist).

The secretary of the organization is Kotaiah and the president Sinhadrai Jhansi.

References

Organisations based in Andhra Pradesh
Politics of Andhra Pradesh
Political parties with year of establishment missing